Kalamandalam Leelamma (c.1952 – 15 June 2017) was a leading Mohiniyattom dancer from Kerala, India.

She was awarded Sangeet Natak Akademi Award for her contribution to Mohiniyattom.

She died on 15 June 2017.

References

External links
Official website

1950s births
2017 deaths
Recipients of the Sangeet Natak Akademi Award
Performers of Indian classical dance
Dancers from Kerala
Mohiniyattam exponents
Malayali people
Indian female classical dancers
Women artists from Kerala
20th-century Indian dancers
20th-century Indian women artists
Year of birth uncertain